Steven Christopher Buxton (born 13 March 1960) is an English former footballer, who played as a forward. He made over 200 appearances over two spells for Wrexham in the football league and also made football league appearances for Stockport County.

Career
Buxton started his career at Wrexham, coming up from the youth team in 1977 to make 109 appearances for the club.

After his initial spell at Wrexham, he had brief spells with Stockport County and Altrincham before returning to Wrexham to make a further 121 appearances for the club.

Upon leaving Wrexham, Buxton would play for a further 7 clubs in England and Wales.

References

Living people
1960 births
English Football League players
Cymru Premier players
Wrexham A.F.C. players
Stockport County F.C. players
Altrincham F.C. players
Telford United F.C. players
Northwich Victoria F.C. players
Mold Alexandra F.C. players
Bangor City F.C. players
Holywell Town F.C. players
Flint Town United F.C. players
Lex XI F.C. players
Association football forwards
English footballers